The North Knox Career and Technical Education Center is a public school located in Halls Crossroads, Tennessee.  The school shares a campus with Halls High School.

The mission of the North Knox Career and Technical Education Center is to help empower students for effective participation in a global society.  The programs are designed to contribute to the broad academic achievement of all students by showing the relevance of academic content through real world application. These programs also develop their ability to work independently, understand the importance of teamwork, think creatively and solve problems through the use of technology.  The school's director is H.B. Jenkins, assistant principal for Halls High School.

References

Schools in Knox County, Tennessee
Technical schools
Public high schools in Tennessee